Theresa Anne Tull (born October 2, 1936) was the United States Ambassador to Guyana (1987-1990) and Brunei from 1993 until 1996.

Tull was born in Runnemede, New Jersey. She graduated from Camden Catholic High School, has a bachelor’s degree from the University of Maryland, and a master’s degree in Southeast Asian Studies from the University of Michigan in 1973.

Career

Tull was deputy principal officer to the U.S. Consulate General in Da Nang, where she remained until the fall of Vietnam in the spring of 1975, chargé d’affaires in Laos (November 1983 until August 1986) and ambassador to Guyana.

While in Laos, she negotiated the right to search for remains of soldiers missing in action.  She coordinated the evacuation of Da Nang and returned to the US with three Vietnamese children.  She cared for them until their parents were able to join them.

Publications
 A LONG WAY FROM RUNNEMEDE: One Woman’s Foreign Service Journey

References

1936 births
People from Runnemede, New Jersey
Ambassadors of the United States to Laos
Ambassadors of the United States to Guyana
Ambassadors of the United States to Brunei
University System of Maryland alumni
University of Michigan alumni
American women ambassadors
Camden Catholic High School alumni
Living people
20th-century American diplomats
20th-century American women
21st-century American women